
Gmina Biały Dunajec is a rural gmina (administrative district) in Tatra County, Lesser Poland Voivodeship, in southern Poland.

Villages
Gmina Biały Dunajec contains the villages and settlements of Biały Dunajec, Gliczarów Dolny, Gliczarów Górny, Leszczyny and Sierockie.

Neighbouring gminas
Gmina Biały Dunajec is bordered by the gminas of Bukowina Tatrzańska, Czarny Dunajec, Poronin and Szaflary.

References
Polish official population figures 2006

Bialy Dunajec
Tatra County